Acos District is one of seven districts of the Acomayo Province in Peru.

Geography 
Other mountains are listed below:

 Hatun Urqu
 Inti Qhawarina
 Kunkayuq
 Markan Urqu
 Nina Urqu
 Wayna Pata

Ethnic groups 
The people in the district are mainly indigenous citizens of Quechua descent. Quechua is the language which the majority of the population (88.55%) learnt to speak in childhood, 11.11% of the residents started speaking using the Spanish language (2007 Peru Census).

See also 
 Aqumayu

References

Districts of the Acomayo Province